Kushk-e Zar (also Romanized as Kūshk-e Z̄ar, Kashk Zar, Koshgozar, Kūshak Zar, Koshk-e Zar; also known as Koshk-e Zar-e Qadīm) is a village in Chendar Rural District, Chendar District, Savojbolagh County, Alborz Province, Iran. At the 2006 census, its population was 495, in 137 families.

References 

Populated places in Savojbolagh County